Nicanor Santa Ana Abelardo (February 7, 1893 – March 21, 1934) was a Filipino composer known for kundiman songs he wrote before the Second World War.

Biography

Early life 
Nicanor Abelardo was born in San Miguel de Mayumo, Bulacan to Valentin Abelardo and Placida Santa Ana, on February 7, 1893 His mother belonged to a family of artists in Guagua, the Henson. He was introduced to music when he was five years old when his father taught him the solfeggio, the bandurria, and the guitar at 6. His quick mastery of the instruments has made him a prodigy in town. He could play his father's arrangement of Rossini's "William Tell Overture" on the guitar at age 6. He also learned the violin and other string instruments given to him by his father, and learned how to play quickly without much difficulty. In 1901, he wrote his first composition, "Ang Unang Buko" and dedicated it to his grandmother.

In 1902, Nicanor's uncle, the painter Juan Abelardo, took him to Manila to attend several schools. During this time Nicanor became the favorites among the haranistas who admired him of his skill at such a young age. This was also the time where he learned how to play the piano. He saw a piano for the first time at a factory of one of his uncle's clients, and immediately taught himself how to play it. By the time his uncle's job was finished, he can already play an air on the piano. The household was even more surprised when he started accompanying his cousin's singing on the piano. This has led his uncle to enroll him to a private lesson in voice under Enrico Capozzi, who was so impressed by Nicanor's abilities that he refused to accept any fee whatsoever. The same thing also happened when he started formally studied Bandurria under Jose Silos. By this time he was 13 years old, the famed pianist Francisco Buencamino took note of his skill in playing the piano, and helped him take a job at a saloon as a pianist.

However, in 1907, he returned to his hometown and finished his 6th grade there after which he was teaching music in various barrio schools around town. but after a year he went back to Manila permanently.

Time in Manila 
In 1908 he returned to Manila and took employment in various small theaters and cinemas. He soon climbed up to the bigger and better class theaters in the city. He eventually became the leader of Cine Majestic Orchestra, an orchestra from a famous cinema. During this time he met Sixta Naguiat at a cinema, which would become his wife in later years.

Career 
In 1916, Abelardo entered the newly-established University of the Philippines Conservatory of Music, taking courses under Guy F. Harrison and Robert Schofield. During his studies, he composed the melody of the university's official anthem, U.P. Naming Mahal in 1917. The Conservatory instantly noticed his musical ability and by 1918, he was appointed assistant instructor in solfeggio and harmony. He took lessons in piano under Jose Estella, violin under Bonifacio Abdon, and voice under Victorino Carrion. He continued conducting cinema orchestras and play the piano at saloons and cabarets during this time, and this is also the time where he learned to drink alcohol. in 1921 he finally received his degree in science and composition, and thereafter took a post-graduate course which he finished the next year. On 1924 he became head of the composition department of the conservatory, and at night taught private music lessons to some prominent families.

He wrote most of his important works while teaching at the conservatory. His graduation piece, a Piano Sonata in G Major, was the first Sonata made by a Filipino composer and his post-graduate piece, the Piano Concerto in B-flat minor, was the first concerto made by a Filipino composer. Almost all of his kundiman was written during his time as well.

He asked a leave of one year because "There is a greater demand in my activities which demand my whole personal attention." He resigned his post in 1930 only to be reinstated in the same year. In 1931 he received a grant to pursue advanced musical studies abroad. He accepted the offer despite his little savings, seeing his bright prospects in the future.

Alcoholism 
Abelardo began to drink in the early 1920s, and ever since then, he did not pass a day without drinking alcohol. In later years, his alcoholism became uncontrollable which affected his life. In one instance in 1923 he directed the Jazz Band at the Manila Hotel with himself at the piano, or he picked such instruments as he pleased. This greatly amused the people, but he did not stay long because he had lost control of his drinking, and became hospitalized for a month because of it. Another instance while rehearsing the Santa Ana Cabaret Orchestra, the manager found him in a corner drunk with a bottle of booze at one hand, which led him to be dismissed from the job. However the manager reinstated him, as no one can lead the orchestra as good as him.

Studies in Chicago 
In May 1931 he left Manila for Chicago and enrolled at the Chicago Musical College under Wesley LaViolette. During this time he got influenced by the musical innovations of the Second Viennese School, Hindemith, and other post-romantic composers of Europe. In barely a month he fully absorbed the new musical style he was exposed to, as evident in his Violin Sonata which he had written in 3 weeks after he started studying there. His music became popular in the college and with his Cinderella Overture, he was granted the LaViolette Scholarship award. But even with the scholarship, the depression-stricken Chicago, and his alcoholism made it hard for Abelardo to live in the city. He returned to Manila in 1932 without his diploma, because he did not have enough academic credits. He received the diploma after studying at the National University.

Later Years 
He resumed his teaching at the Conservatory after returning to Manila. While he was in Chicago, his family ran a boarding house near the conservatory to support him. He eventually ran the boarding house himself when he returned. The boarding house was nicknamed "The Little Conservatory" because he would teach the students there at night, among them the composers Lucino Sacramento and the future National Artist Antonino Buenaventura. His final large complete work, Requiem, was written in 1934 in memory of the composer Marcelo Adonay.

Death 
He died on March 21, 1934 to heart failure due to alcoholic causes. He was buried at the La Loma Cemetery. He left behind various sketches of unfinished music, among them a symphony and an opera.

Legacy 
Nicanor Abelardo, along with Francisco Santiago, is known for redefining the kundiman, bringing the form to art-song status. Abelardo's kundiman songs, such as "Mutya ng Pasig", "Nasaan ka, Irog?", and "Bituing Marikit" proved to be popular among the Filipino people, and his compositions are regularly played in concerts in the Philippines.

Nicanor's relative Richard Abelardo made a film in 1950 called "Mutya ng Pasig" which is based on Nicanor's kundiman of the same name.

The main theater of the Cultural Center of the Philippines and the building housing the College of Music in UP Diliman (Abelardo Hall) were named in his honor and memory.

List of Works
In E. Arsenio Manuel's Biography of Abelardo (1955), Manuel lists 149 works. Some works not included in Manuel's 1955 list is included here. His famous or important works are highlighted below.
{| class="wikitable sortable"
|+
Compositions of Nicanor Abelardo
! width="10%" |Date
! width="25%" |Title
! width="15%" |Genre
!Opus
! class="unsortable" width="50%" |Notes
!Status     
|-
|1901
|Ang Unang Buko
|Waltz, Bandurria solo
|
|Dedicated to his Grandmother Macaria Libunao
|Lost
|-
|1905
|Filipino Boy
|Two-step
|
|
|
|-
|1909
|Baanag at Lakas
|Band, March
|
|Dedicated to the Confederacion Bulakeña
|Published
|-
|1911
|Lucila
|Sarswela
|
|In 3 parts. libretto by Florentino Ballecer. 
|
|-
|1913
|Akibat
|Sarswela
|
|In 1 Act. libretto by Florentino Ballecer. 
|Libretto only
|-
|1915 July 2
|Sa Bubungan
|Play
|
|In 1 act. unknown librettist
|
|-
|1915
|Dalawang Pag-asa
|Play
|
|In 1 act. libretto by Florentino Ballecer
|
|-
|1916/1917
|Amorosa
|Vocal, Foxtrot
|
|Spanish Lyrics by Jesus Balmori
|Published
|-
|1917
|U.P. Beloved
|Vocal
|
|Winner of the University Hymn competition. English Lyrics by Teogenes Velez
|Published
|-
|1918 April 28
|Kapabayaan/Bunga ng Masamang Hilig
|Sarswela
|
|In 1 act. Tagalog Text by Felix Auxilio Roxas
|
|-
|1918 April 28
|Kawanggawa
|Sarswela
|
|In 1 act. Tagalog Text by Felix Auxilio Roxas
|
|-
|1920
|Kung Hindi Man
|Vocal, Kundiman
|
|Tagalog Lyrics by the composer, English Translation by Atilano Montesa
|Published
|-
|1921
|Academic Overture
|Piano, Orchestral
|
|Originally for 2 pianos, later arranged by Antonino Buenaventura for orchestra.
|Ms.
|-
|1921
|An Old Love Song
|Vocal
|
|Adopted from Dowland's Songbook
|
|-
|1921
|String Quartet in F Major
|Chamber
|1, no. 1
|for String Quartet. In 4 movements: Allegro, Andante, alla Minueto, Rondo: Allegro Moderato. 
|Lost
|-
|1921
|Sonata in G Major
|Piano, Sonata
|3, no. 1?
|In 3 movements: Allegro, Adagio, Presto. The first Piano Sonata made by a Filipino composer. It was submitted as a graduation piece. The work was lost.
|Lost
|-
|1921
|Sonata in C Major
|Piano, Sonata
|3, no. 2
|In 3 movements: Allegro con moto, Adagio, Rondo: Allegro con moto quasi vivace. It was submitted as a graduation piece.
|Ms.
|-
|1921
|Sonata
|Piano, Sonata
|3, no. 3?
|In 4 movements: Allegro, Andante alla Minueto, Rondo, Allegro Moderato. 
|Lost
|-
|1921
|Longing
|Vocal, Chamber
|
|Quartet for three voices
|
|-
|1921
|Fughetta in C on a Theme by Mozart
|Chamber
|
|for String Quartet
|Ms.
|-
|1921
|Mountain Suite
|Orchestral
|
|In 4 movements: 
Ang Liwayway (Dawn), Sayaw ng mga Diwata (Dance of the Nymphs), Ang Matanda sa Punso (The Old Man of the Anthill), Ang Sayaw ng mga Ita (Negrito Dance)
The material for this suite was reworked from his sarswela Akibat. Originally called Mountain Scenes.
|
|-
|1921
|Ave Maria
|Vocal, Chamber, Sacred
|
|
|Published
|-
|1921
|Nocturne
|Piano solo
|
|From Three Pieces for the Pianoforte
|Lost
|-
|1921
|Valse Caprice
|Piano solo
|
|From Three Pieces for the Pianoforte
|Lost
|-
|1921
|Fantasie-Impromptu
|Piano solo
|
|From Three Pieces for the Pianoforte
|Ms. copy
|-
|1921
|The Violet
|Vocal
|
|a trio for 3 sopranos
|
|-
|1921
|U.P. Spells "Up"
|Vocal
|
|from The First University Song Collection of the University of the Philippines. English text by Guy Potter Benton.
|Published
|-
|1921
|Alma Mater U.P.
|Vocal
|
|from The First University Song Collection of the University of the Philippines. English text by Gerardo Monden.
|Published
|-
|1921
|Conservatory Commencement Hymn
|Choral, Hymn
|
|from The First University Song Collection of the University of the Philippines. English text by Robert Schofield.
|Published
|-
|1921
|Coronation March
|Orchestral, March
|
|written for the Carnival Queen Carmencita Prieto
|
|-
|1921
|First Nocturne
|Piano solo
|
|
|Published
|-
|1921
|Cavatina
|Chamber
|7
|for Violin and Piano. Published 1927 by Theodore Presser Co.
|Published
|-
|1921
|Romanza
|Chamber
|8
|for Cello and Piano; dedicated to Antonio Molina. Published 1928 by Oliver Ditson Company
|Published
|-
|1921
|Valse Caprice
|Piano solo
|
|dedicated to Pedro Eloriaga
|Lost
|-
|1922
|Serenade
|Chamber
|
|for Cello and Piano
|
|-
|1922
|Ang Aking Bayan
|Vocal
|
|Tagalog Lyrics by the composer
|Published
|-
|1922
|Paraluman
|Vocal, Waltz
|
|Tagalog Lyrics by Mariano Velayo
|Published
|-
|1922
|Valse in D-flat
|Piano Solo
|11
|
|Lost
|-
|1922
|An Offertory to St. Cecilia
|Vocal, Sacred
|
|
|
|-
|1922
|A Historical Pageant
|Band, Incidental Music
|
|Consists of an Overture and 12 other movements:
I. Sight of the Ship, II-IV. Untitled, V. Dance of the Bolomen, VI. Untitled, VII. Shields and Spears, VIII. Untitled, IX. Kumintang Dance, X. Untitled XI. Pasodoble for Exit, XII. Blood Compact.
|Ms.
|-
|1922
|Princess' Dance
|Piano
|
|Movement from A Historical Pageant arranged to piano.
|Published
|-
|1922 September 13
|Initiation Song
|Vocal
|
|for the Rizal Center Fraternity
|
|-
|1922
|Ang Mestisa
|Sarswela
|
|libretto by Ingracio Valmonte
|
|-
|1922 November 30
|Bonifacio Song
|Vocal, March
|
|English Lyrics by Francisco Carballo
|
|-
|1923
|Nasaan ka Irog
|Vocal, Kundiman
|
|Tagalos Lurics by Nemestio Asistio, Spanish version by Jesus Balmori
|Published
|-
|1923
|Kundiman
|Chamber
|
|for Violin and Piano
|Published
|-
|1923
|Piano Concerto in B-flat minor
|Concerto
|12
|In 3 Movements: Allegro Moderato, Andante Romantico, Allegro Fantastico. It was the first Piano Concerto written by a Filipino Composer.
|Ms. copy
|-
|1923
|Processional March
|Orchestral, March
|
|
|
|-
|1923
|Capriccio Espagnole
|Chamber
|15
|for violin and piano
|Published
|-
|1923
|Pearl of the Orient
|Band, March
|
|Recorded by the Baliuag Buenaventura Band in 1958
|Ms.
|-
|1924 January 9
|Wedding March
|Orchestral, March
|
|for the wedding anniversary of Marcelo Adonay
|
|-
|1924 March 29
|Stabat Mater
|Vocal, Chamber, Sacred
|
|
|Ms.
|-
|1924
|Meditation
|Harmonium solo
|
|
|
|-
|1924
|Kundiman ng Luha
|Vocal, Kundiman
|
|Tagalog Lyrics by Jose Corazon de Jesus; Dedicated to Samahang Bulakan
|Published
|-
|1924
|Petite Serenade
|Chamber
|
|for violin and piano
|
|-
|1924 December 30
|Ultimo Adios
|Choral, Orchestral
|
|for Female Chorus and Orchestra; Composition based on a poem by Jose Rizal
|Published
|-
|1925
|Magbalik ka, Hirang
|Vocal, Kundiman
|
|Tagalog Lyrics by Filomena Alcanar; Dedicated to Candida Moreno; with violin obbligato
|
|-
|1925
|Pahimakas
|Vocal
|
|Tagalog Lyrics by Jose Corazon de Jesus; Dedicated to Jose Mossesgeld Santiago
|Published
|-
|1925
|Canto del Viajero
|Vocal
|
|Composition based on a poem by Jose Rizal
|Published
|-
|1926 May 2
|Dakilang Punglo
|Sarswela
|
|in 3 acts; libretto by Servando de los Angeles.
|
|-
|1926
|Bituing Marikit
|Vocal, Danza Menor
|
|from the sarswela Dakilang Punglo
|Published
|-
|1926
|Health Service Hymn
|Choral, Hymn
|
|for the Philippine Health Service, Manila
|
|-
|1926
|Mutya ng Pasig
|Vocal, Kumintang
|
|Tagalog Lyrics by Deogracias A. Rosario, later arranged for orchestra by the composer
|Published
|-
|1927
|Himno kay Plaridel
|Orchestral
|
|Manuscript copy for Voice and Piano exists dated August 20, 1927
|Ms. copy
|-
|1928
|Himutok
|Vocal, Kundiman
|
|Tagalog Lyrics by the composer
|Published
|-
|1928
|Valse Extase
|Chamber, Waltz
|
|for saxophone and piano
|
|-
|1928
|National Heroes' Day Hymn
|Choral, Hymn
|
|Lyrics by Alfredo B. German
|Published
|-
|1928
|Into your Eyes
|Vocal, Ballad
|
|English lyrics by Paul R. Verzosa
|
|-
|1929 December 23
|Balitaw
|Vocal, Ballad
|
|Visayan Lyrics by Ramon Abellanos, Tagalogg Byrics by the composer
|
|-
|1929
|Pahiwatig
|Vocal, Danza
|
|Tagalog Lyrics by the composer. Dedicated to Clarita Tankiang
|Published
|-
|1929
|Reverie
|Chamber
|
|for violin and piano
|
|-
|1929
|Ang Dakilang Pagyayakap
|Vocal, Paso-doble
|
|Lyrics by Florentino Ballecer
|Published
|-
|1929
|Ikaw Rin
|Vocal, Kundiman
|
|Tagalog Lyrics by the composer, Spanish version by Manuel Barnabe, Dedicated to Celedonia Ongpin
|Published
|-
|1929 December 23
|Paalam sa Pagkakadalaga
|Folk
|
|Folk song arrangement
|
|-
|1929 December 23
|Lulay
|Folk
|
|Folk song arrangement
|
|-
|1929 December 23
|May Isang Bulaklak na Ibig Lumitaw
|Folk
|
|Folk song arrangement
|
|-
|1930
|Kumintang ng Bayan
|Vocal, Kumintang
|
|Lyrics by the composer
|
|-
|1930
|Kung ako'y Umibig
|Vocal, Kundiman
|
|Lyrics by the composer
|Published
|-
|1930 May
|Himno Masonico
|Choral, Hymn
|
|winner in a contest by the Grand Lodge of Manila
|
|-
|1930
|Halika, Magandang Mutya
|Vocal, Serenade
|
|Lyrics by the composer
|
|-
|1930
|Marcha Triunfal
|March
|
|Dedicated to Logia Isla de Luzon no. 57
|
|-
|1930
|Sa Iyong Kandungan
|Vocal, Kundiman
|
|Tagalog Lyrics by the composer; Sugbuanon Lyrics by Manuel Velez
|Published
|-
|1930
|Nasaan ang aking Puso
|Vocal, Kundiman
|
|
|Published
|-
|1930
|Naku Kenkoy
|Vocal
|
|Tagalog Lyrics by Romulado G. Ramos
|Published
|-
|1930 April 17
|Tayo'y Pakasal na
|Vocal, Sarswela
|
|A song from a sarswela by Servando de los Angeles
|
|-
|1930
|Reminiscenes
|Vocal
|
|Favorite song of Isagani Velayo's grandmother transcribed by Abelardo. Tagalog Lyrics by Valentin Abelardo
|
|-
|1930 April 7
|Ay Kalisud
|Folk, Foxtrot
|
|Arranged as a foxtrot for orchestra
|
|-
|1930 April 7
|Batobato at Siniguelas
|Vocal, Sarswela
|
|additional song from a Tagalog Sarswela
|
|-
|1930 June 10
|Anong Sarap mong Umibig
|Vocal, Sarswela
|
|additional song from a Tagalog Sarswela Dalawang Pag-asa by Florentino Ballecer
|
|-
|1930
|Ang Puso ko'y Nalulumbay
|Vocal, Sarswela
|
|additional song from a Tagalog Sarswela Dakilang Punglo by Florentino Ballecer
|
|-
|1930 June 30
|Ayokong Ayoko
|Vocal
|
|Music and Lyrics by Florentino Ballecer, harmonized by Abelardo
|
|-
|1930 June 21
|Doon po sa Aming Bayan
|Vocal
|
|Music and Lyrics by Florentino Ballecer, harmonized by Abelardo
|
|-
|1930 June 21
|Walang Palad sa Paggiliw
|Vocal
|
|A "Duo de Amor"
|
|-
|1930 June 21
|Ang Dagat na Malawak
|Vocal
|
|A Barcarole
|
|-
|1930 June 21
|Ang Babae kung Pangit
|Vocal
|
|Music and Lyrics by Florentino Ballecer, harmonized by Abelardo
|
|-
|1930 June 21
|Pag-ibig na Walang Hanggan
|Vocal
|
|A duet
|
|-
|1930 July 12
|Hoy-hoy
|Vocal
|
|
|
|-
|1930 July 12
|May Isang Dalagang Nanggaling sa Bukid
|Vocal
|
|
|
|-
|1930 July 12
|Ayaw sa Pusa
|Vocal
|
|An "Awit Lansangan" Music and by Florentino Ballecer and Abelardo; Lyrics by Ballecer
|
|-
|1930 July 12
|Sa Gintong Panaginip
|Vocal, Kumintang
|
|Lyrics by Florentino Ballecer
|
|-
|1930 July 12
|Sa Pugad ng Paggiliw
|Vocal
|
|Music and Lyrics by Florentino Ballecer, harmonized by Abelardo
|
|-
|1930 July 12
|Kaiingat Ka
|Vocal
|
|Music and Lyrics by Florentino Ballecer, harmonized by Abelardo
|
|-
|1930 July 12
|Sa Bayang Marungko
|Vocal
|
|Music and Lyrics by Florentino Ballecer, harmonized by Abelardo
|
|-
|1931 January 10
|Intermezzo
|Band
|
|Awarded First Prize and gold medal at the 1931 Philippine Carnival Contest, entered under the pseudonym "Batong-Buhay"
|
|-
|1931 January 10
|Valse Elegante
|Band
|
|Awarded First Prize at the 1931 Philippine Carnival Contest, entered under the pseudonym "Araw"
|
|-
|1931 February
|Ang Likha ni Pierrot/Batik ng Kabihasnan
|Sarswela
|
|libretto by Florentino Ballecer
|
|-
|1931 March 5
|Buhay ng Binata't Dalaga
|Vocal
|
|Dialogue by Danding Gabriel
|
|-
|1931 March 5
|Bibingka't Langgunisa
|Vocal
|
|Dialogue by Danding Gabriel
|
|-
|1931 June 5
|Waltz
|Waltz
|
|written in Chicago
|
|-
|1931 June
|Fugue for String Quartet
|Chamber
|
|written in Chicago
|
|-
|1931 June 28
|The Flower and the Bird
|Chamber, Caprice
|
|written in Chicago; for flute, violin, and piano
|
|-
|1931 July 5
|A Summer Idyll
|Chamber
|
|written in Chicago; for violin, clarinet, and piano
|
|-
|1931 July 22
|A Naughty Nymph
|Chamber, polka
|
|written in Chicago; for flute and piano
|
|-
|1931 July 28
|Fifes and Castagnettes
|Chamber, Bolero
|
|written in Chicago; for flute and piano
|
|-
|1931 September 7
|Violin Sonata
|Chamber
|
|written in Chicago; In 3 movements: Allegro, Andante, Allegro con moto. The first movement was finished on July 13, 1931.
|Ms.
|-
|1931 November 25
|Cinderella Overture
|Orchestral, Overture
|
|written in Chicago; this piece won him the LaViolette Scholarship Award
|Ms.
|-
|1931 November 25
|Sinfonietta for String Orchestra
|Orchestral
|
|written in Chicago
|Ms.
|-
|1931 November
|Panoramas
|Chamber
|
|written in Chicago; for flute, violin, viola, celesta, and piano
|Ms.
|-
|1932 January 8
|Second Fugue for String Quartet
|Chamber
|
|written in Chicago
|Ms.
|-
|1932 June
|Symphony
|Orchestral
|
|written in Chicago; unfinished; intended to be his graduate piece but he chose Sonata for String Quartet instead.
|Lost
|-
|1932 June 6
|Sonata for String Quartet
|Chamber
|
|written in Chicago; offered as graduate composition
|
|-
|1932 October 7
|A Study in Kumintang
|Chamber
|
|for Piano and String Quartet; Dedicated for the wedding anniversary of Hon. Noberto Romualdez
|Ms.
|-
|1932
|Salve Regina Mater
|Vocal, Chamber, Sacred
|
|for Soprano, baritone, and trio
|
|-
|1932
|Visayan Caprice
|Chamber
|
|for violin, cello, and piano
|Published
|-
|1932
|Emilio Jacinto
|Vocal
|
|English lyrics by Francisco Carballo
|
|-
|1932
|Song of the Lonesome Traveller
|Vocal
|
|
|Published
|-
|1933
|Spirit of '96
|Overture
|
|for Band
|
|-
|1933
|National Institute Song
|Vocal
|
|
|
|-
|1933
|Himig ng bayan
|Chamber, Overture
|
|for String Band. Composed for the Doce Estrellas Society of Licab, Nueva Ecija
|
|-
|1933
|Carola
|Foxtrot
|
|a tango-foxtrot
|
|-
|1934 January
|Dawn
|Dance
|
|A dance composed for a Pageant titled "The Triumph of Eros" held by the University of the Philippines on 6 February 1934.<ref>{{cite news|url=https://trove.nla.gov.au/newspaper/article/249626654|title=Dances and Music for U. P. Pageant "The Triumph of Eros Assembled|date=25 January 1934|work=The Tribune}}</ref> Instrumentation by Antonino Buenaventura.
|
|-
|1934 March 15
|Panghanga
|Vocal, Kundiman
|
|dedicated to Carnival Queen Clarita Tankiang
|
|-
|1934
|Requiem
|Choral, Orchestral, Sacred
|
|Composed in memory of Marcelo Adonay.
|Lost
|-
|1934
|Florante at Laura
|Opera
|
|unfinished|Lost
|-
|undated|Violin Concerto
|Concerto
|
|unfinished; Exists as Violin and Piano; one movement completed and arranged by Antonio Molina for violin and orchestra Exact date of composition unknown, but stylistic analysis of the work has estimated the composition date to be roughly 1920.
|Ms. copy
|-
|undated|Rondo and Double Fugue
|Orchestral
|
|unfinished.|
|-
|undated|Un cuento de Lola Basiang
|Vocal
|
|A musical sketch in 7 scenes
|
|-
|undated|Lola Basyang
|Band, March
|
|Recorded by the Baliuag Buenaventura Band in 1958
|Ms.
|-
|undated|Kasaganaan
|Band, March
|
|Recorded by the Baliuag Buenaventura Band in 1958
|Ms.
|-
|undated|Tinig ng mga Kahabag-habag
|Vocal
|
|Dedicated to the lepers
|
|-
|undated|Visayan Orientale
|Waltz
|
|
|
|-
|undated|Ang Binatang Filipino
|Waltz
|
|co-composed with Jose L. Santos
|
|-
|undated|Sa Libingan ng Irog
|Vocal, Kundiman
|
|Tagalog Lyrics by Pedro Icasiano
|
|-
|undated|Our National Pride
|Vocal
|
|Dedicated to Gabino Tabuñar of the National University
|
|-
|undated|Libertador
|Choral, Hymn
|
|Dedicated to Sergio Osmeña
|
|-
|undated|Grand March
|March
|
|
|
|-
|undated|Ikaw
|Tango
|
|
|
|-
|undated|Bunying M. H. Del Pilar
|Hymn
|
|Probably composed 1920; probably the same piece as Himno Plaridel|
|-
|undated|Modernista
|
|
|
|
|-
|undated|Ode to the Sampagita
|Vocal
|
|English Lyrics by Mauro Mendel. Composed for the Philippine Women's University
|
|-
|undated|Honor and Arms
|Orchestral, March
|
|
|
|-
|undated|Sumilang
|Sarswela
|
|In 3 acts; libretto by Basilio Lanuza. Written after 1911
|
|-
|undated|Makabagong Dalaga
|Play
|
|In 3 acts. Lyrics by Mariano Velayo.
|
|-
|undated|Ang Tala ng Universidad
|Sarswela
|
|In 3 acts; libretto by Danding Gabriel
|
|-
|undated|Ang Batang Tulisan
|Play
|
|In 4 acts; libretto by Bernardino Buenaventura; Lyrics by Danding Gabriel
|
|-
|undated|Puri ng Mahirap
|Sarswela
|
|librettist unknown
|
|}

 Discography 
Many of Abelardo's songs and kundimans were recorded during his lifetime by his friends and colleagues, such as Jose Mossesgeld Santiago and Jovita Fuentes. After the war his kundimans were frequently recorded by recording artists such as Sylvia la Torre, Conching Rosal, and Don David. The following is an incomplete list of recordings of some of his famous kundimans:

 Footnotes 

References

 E. Epistola (1996) Nicanor Abelardo, The Man and the Artist, Manila: Rex Book Store.
 A. Ocampo (1987) The life and music of Maestro Nicanor Abelardo, Manila: Cultural Center of the Philippines.
 R. Santos (2005) Tunugan: Four Essays on Filipino Music, Quezon City: University of the Philippines Press.
 N. Tiongson (Ed.) (2019). CCP Encyclopedia of Philippine Art (Vol. 7: Music). Manila: Cultural Center of the Philippines.
 E. Arsenio Manuel (1955) Dictionary of Philippine biography'' (Vol. 1) Quezon City: Filipiniana Publications.

External links
 
First Nocturne - on YouTube 
 Nicanor Abelardo bio
 Language Poetry and Drama in the Art Music of Nicanor Abelardo

1893 births
1934 deaths
20th-century composers
Filipino classical composers
Kapampangan people
Musicians from Bulacan
People from San Miguel, Bulacan